A minor planet is "lost" when today's observers cannot find it, because its location is too uncertain to target observations. This happens if the orbital elements of a minor planet are not known accurately enough, typically because the observation arc for the object is too short, or too few observations were made before the object became unobservable (e.g. too faint due to increasing distance, or too close to the Sun to view at night).

By some definitions thousands, if not tens of thousands, of mostly small observed minor planets are lost. Some lost minor planets discovered in decades past cannot be found because the available observational data is insufficient for reliable orbit determination.  With limited information astronomers cannot know where to look for the object at future dates.

Lost objects are sometimes recovered when serendipitously re-observed by a later astronomical survey. If the orbital elements of the newly found object are sufficiently close to those of the earlier lost object, the two may be equated. This can be established by calculating backwards the "new" object's orbit (once it is firmly known) and checking past positions against those previously recorded for the lost object. This usually greatly extends the object's arc length, thus fixing the orbit much more precisely. The back-orbit calculations are especially tricky for lost comets because their orbits can be affected by non-gravitational forces, such as emission of jets of gas from the comet nucleus. Many previously lost asteroids (a type of minor planet) were rediscovered in the 1980s and 1990s, but many minor planets are still lost.

Overview 

This is a small selection of some early lost or notable asteroids with their discovery and rediscovery dates. (A more detailed description for some of these minor planets can be found in the following sections.) The true number of lost asteroids may be over 150,000. There are also about 30,000 unnumbered bodies with a condition code of U = 9, indicating the highest possible uncertainty of their orbit determination. Many of these bodies have been observed years if not decades ago and must be considered lost. There are also more than a thousand near-Earth objects (NEOs) with an observation arc of one or two days only.

20th-century recoveries 

The number of asteroids that were only observed once and not re-observed grew throughout the 19th and 20th centuries, but improved telescopes, searches, and detection techniques led to resolution of most of these cases between 1970 and 2000. There are earlier examples also, such as 132 Aethra, which was lost between 1873 and 1922.

1970s

1980s and 1990s 

Leif Kahl Kristensen at the University of Aarhus rediscovered 452 Hamiltonia and 1537 Transylvania, along with numerous other small objects, in 1981. At the time these results were published, only the nine numbered minor planets 330 Adalberta, 473 Nolli, 719 Albert, 724 Hapag, 843 Nicolaia, 878 Mildred, 1009 Sirene, 1026 Ingrid, and 1179 Mally (below) had remained unobserved since their discoveries:

Other notable recoveries
 While studying in Chicago in 1928, Zhang Yuzhe discovered an asteroid that was given the provisional designation 1928 UF, and later the number 1125. He named it "China", or "中華" Zhōnghuá. However, this asteroid was not observed beyond its initial appearance and a precise orbit could not be calculated. In 1957, the Purple Mountain Observatory in China discovered a new asteroid, and with Zhang Yuzhe's agreement the new object  was reassigned the official designation 1125 China in place of the lost 1928 UF. However, in 1986, the newly discovered object  was confirmed to be a rediscovery of the original 1928 UF, and this object was named 3789 Zhongguo, which is also a name for China.
 The near-Earth asteroid (29075) 1950 DA was discovered on 23 February 1950 by Carl Wirtanen at Lick Observatory. It was observed for 17 days and then lost, since not enough observations were made to allow its orbit to be plotted. It was then rediscovered on 31 December 2000. The chance it will impact Earth on 16 March 2880 is about 1 in 4,000, or 0.025 percent.
 7796 Járacimrman was discovered at the Czech Kleť Observatory on 16 January 1996 by Zdeněk Moravec and was designated 1996 BG. It was observed until April 1996 and then in June and July 1997. It was revealed, by precovery, to be a lost asteroid which had previously been observed twice: at the Brera-Merate Observatory in northern Italy on 12 December 1973 and at the Australian Mount Stromlo Observatory near Canberra, on 8 and 9 July 1990.

21st century 

Recently lost minor planets
  is a  Apollo-class NEO and a Mars-crosser discovered on 20 November 2007, by Andrea Boattini of the Catalina Sky Survey. Early observations of  caused excitement amongst the scientific community when it was estimated as having as high as a 1 in 25 chance of colliding with Mars on 30 January 2008. However, by 9 January 2008 additional observations allowed NASA's Near Earth Object Program (NEOP) to reduce the uncertainty region resulting in only a 1-in-10,000 chance of impact.  most likely passed Mars at a distance of 6.5 Mars radii. Due to this relatively small distance and the uncertainty level of the prior observations, the gravitational effects of Mars on its trajectory are unknown and, according to Steven Chesley of NASA's JPL-Near Earth Object program,  is currently considered "lost". The best fit trajectory had the asteroid passing within 21,000 km of Mars and only 16,000 km from its moon Deimos.
  is a kilometer-sized Amor-class NEO and Mars-crosser discovered on 27 May 2010, by the Wide-field Infrared Survey Explorer (WISE) spacecraft. The asteroid was only observed 19 times during 13–15 January 2010, and has not since been observed. Virtual clones of the asteroid that fit the uncertainty region in the known trajectory, showed a 1 in 770 million chance that the asteroid could have impacted the Earth on 2020 October 20.
 In 2007, the object  was found to be the near-Earth asteroid 6344 P–L, lost since 1960. It is a potentially hazardous object and probably a dormant comet, although it was not visibly outgassing at that time.

See also 
 
 Lost comet
 Precovery

Notes

References

External links 
   
   

Lists of minor planets